Maurice Zolotow (November 23, 1913 - March 14, 1991) was an American show business biographer.  He wrote books and magazine articles. His articles appeared in publications including Life, Collier's Weekly, Reader's Digest, Look, Los Angeles, and many others. His book Marilyn Monroe  was the first written on the iconic actress and the only one published during her lifetime.

Zolotow attended the University of Wisconsin–Madison, where he met his future wife, Charlotte Shapiro. In 1936, after graduation, Zolotow took a job at Billboard, then a publication covering not just the music business, but all aspects of show business. Zolotow was an early jazz lover and gave Duke Ellington his first national review. Zolotow remained devoted to pop culture, literature (one of his closest friends was poet Delmore Schwartz), politics, and magic. As a child, Zolotow recalled seeing Harry Houdini perform at Coney Island and based his novel, The Great Balsamo, on the famous magician. In later life, Zolotow befriended contemporary magician Ricky Jay.

Strangely enough, one of Zolotow's first books, published only in London in 1948, was about Dr. Maurice William, a Russian-born New York dentist and former Socialist, whose 1920 critique of Marxist economics had supposedly influenced Chinese statesman Sun Yat-sen, shortly before his death, to rethink his earlier sympathy for Communism.

Other biographies by Zolotow include Shooting Star, about John Wayne, Stagestruck: The Romance of Alfred Lunt and Lynn Fontanne, concerning the husband and wife Broadway legends, and Billy Wilder in Hollywood, about the Oscar-winning director and screenwriter. He also wrote shorter celebrity profiles on such entertainers as Tallulah Bankhead, Walter Matthau, Grace Kelly, and Milton Berle. A collection of Zolotow's profiles was published in 1951 as No People Like Show People, including pieces on Jimmy Durante, Jack Benny, Oscar Levant, Frank Fay, Fred Allen, Ethel Merman, Jed Harris, as well as Bankhead and Berle.

Zolotow also wrote occasionally on food and alcohol, including several articles on the latter for Playboy. His 1971 piece on absinthe has been widely reprinted. His book, Confessions of a Race Track Fiend, describes Zolotow's own experiences playing the horses at Southern California tracks.

He lived in Hastings-on-Hudson, New York, for much of his adult life, but moved to Los Angeles, California, after his divorce. He had two children, poker enthusiast Steve Zolotow and author Crescent Dragonwagon.  His former wife, to whom he was married from 1938 to 1969, was children's author and editor Charlotte Zolotow.

References

1913 births
1991 deaths
20th-century American Jews
People from Hastings-on-Hudson, New York
University of Wisconsin–Madison alumni
20th-century American male writers
20th-century American biographers
American male biographers
Writers from New York (state)